Chamaesium is a genus of flowering plant in the family Apiaceae, with 5 to 8 species. It is found in Central Asia, China and India.

References

Apioideae
Apioideae genera